Arthur Alexander (1940–1993) was an American country songwriter and soul singer.

Arthur Alexander may also refer to:
 Arthur Alexander (pianist) (1891–1969), New Zealand-born pianist and teacher active in the UK.
Arthur Alexander (producer) (1909–1989), American independent film producer
Arthur Francis O'Donel Alexander (1896–1971), English amateur astronomer and author
Arthur Lewin Alexander (1907–1971), British police officer
Arthur Alexander (album), a 1972 album released by Arthur Alexander

See also

Art Alexandre (1907–1976), Canadian ice hockey player

Alexander, Arthur